Jean-Marc Oroque (born 10 June 1983) is a French professional footballer who plays as a midfielder for Départemental 1 club Paulhan-Pézenas.

References

External links 
 

1983 births
Living people
People from Bourg-la-Reine
Footballers from Hauts-de-Seine
French footballers
Black French sportspeople
Association football midfielders
AS Beauvais Oise players
Sainte-Geneviève Sports players
FC Sète 34 players
SO Romorantin players
Entente SSG players
US Sénart-Moissy players
FC Chartres players
ES Paulhan-Pézenas players
Ligue 2 players
Championnat National players
Championnat National 3 players
Championnat National 2 players
Division d'Honneur players